Sad Loves (Italian: Tristi amori) is a 1943 Italian historical drama film directed by Carmine Gallone and starring Jules Berry, Gino Cervi and Andrea Checchi. It was based on the play of the same title by Giuseppe Giacosa. It was made at Cinecittà in Rome. It is set in the 1880s.

Cast
 Jules Berry as Il conte Ettore Arcieri  
 Gino Cervi as Giulio Scarli  
 Andrea Checchi as Fabrizio Arcieri 
 Luisa Ferida as Emma Scarli  
 Giuseppe Varni as Il cavaliere Rublo  
 Enrico Viarisio as Adriano Rainetti  
 Luigi Allodoli as Giustino, il commesso dello studio Scarli  
 Antonio Anselmo as Il tenente Rovi  
 Amelia Bissi as Marta  
 Gemma Bolognesi as La cassiera del Caffè 'Doria' 
 Margherita Bossi as La signora Rublo  
 Ruggero Capodaglio as Il dottore Brusio  
 Ernesto Collo as Il socio palermitano  
 Enzo Gainotti as Un socio del Circolo  
 Toscano Giuntini as Un' ufficiale  
 Luciano Manara as Un' ufficiale di Stato Maggiore  
 Giuseppe Pierozzi as Il sarto 
 Livia Venturini as La signorina Rublo
 Renato Malavasi as Il ragionere del Circolo 
 Giorgio Fini as Un' ufficiale 
 Andrea Volo as Un' ufficiale

References

Bibliography 
 Nowell-Smith, Geoffrey & Hay, James & Volpi, Gianni. The Companion to Italian Cinema. Cassell, 1996.

External links 
 

1943 films
Italian historical drama films
1940s historical drama films
1940s Italian-language films
Films directed by Carmine Gallone
Italian films based on plays
Films based on works by Giuseppe Giacosa
Films set in the 1880s
Films set in Italy
Films shot at Cinecittà Studios
Italian black-and-white films
Films scored by Alessandro Cicognini
1940s Italian films